Grant Barlow (born 28 March 1980) is an Australian movement coach and former soccer player.

Loaned to Clementi Khalsa in June 2001, Barlow kept a clean sheet as Clementi Khalsa drew 0–0 with Tampines Rovers and was named man-of-the-match for his unblemished performances in the game. He has over 15 years of experience as a personal trainer and movement coach.

References

Singapore Premier League players
1980 births
Australian expatriate soccer players
Australian soccer players
Association football goalkeepers
Balestier Khalsa FC players
Living people
Expatriate footballers in Singapore
National Soccer League (Australia) players